Dhumah Eri Thari is a 2001 Maldivian drama film written and directed by Mohamed Abdul Hakeem. Produced by Hussain Rasheed under Farivaa Films, the film stars Ahmed Asim, Aishath Humeydha, Raifa Yoosuf and Mohamed Abdul Hakeem in pivotal roles. The film narrates the story of two sisters who are ready to sacrifice their own happiness for the sake of the other.

Plot
 
Sithura  and Thasleema  are two orphans and exemplary siblings who unconditionally love each other. Thasleema treats her younger sister like a mother. Javid, a law graduate, returns to his island and starts a romantic relationship with Sithura, while Thasleema is smitten by him but too timid to reveal her feelings. Javid’s mother  arranges his marriage with Thasleema. The latter shares the news with Sithura, who rejoices in her sister’s happiness with a broken heart. To pave the way into her sister’s joy, Sithura marries a thug, Ajuwad, despite Thasleema’s disapproval. The two sisters separate and walk in their own path until fate brings them together ruining Thasleema’s gleeful life.

Cast 
 Ahmed Asim as Javid
 Aishath Humeydha as Fathimath Sithura
 Raifa Yoosuf as Thasleema
 Mohamed Abdul Hakeem as Ajuwad Hassan
 Mohamed Ibrahim
 Haajara Abdul Kareem as Dhon Kaiydha; Javid's mother
 Suheil
 Suzeyn
 Ahmed Ibrahim
 Ahmed Anwar
 Aishath Gulfa
 Ahmed Naseem
 Dhon Kamana
 Baby Zayan
 Baby Zeeko

Soundtrack

Response
Upon release, the film received mixed to positive reviews from critics, where the performance of the lead actors were praised though the predictable storyline was lauded for its melodrama.

References

Maldivian drama films
2001 films
2001 drama films
Dhivehi-language films